Taurean James Green (born November 28, 1986) is a Georgian-American  professional basketball player who last played for Stal Ostrów Wielkopolski of the Polish Basketball League (PLK). He is the son of former NBA journeyman Sidney Green. Green played college basketball for the University of Florida, where he was a member of the Florida Gators teams that won back-to-back NCAA national championships in 2006 and 2007.  He also played internationally for Georgia after gaining citizenship in June 2010.

Early years 
Green was born in Boca Raton, Florida, in 1986.  He attended a different school for each of his four years of high school.(Freshman/Lake Howell HS, Sophomore/Westminster Academy, Junior/Bradenton Pendleton Academy, Senior/Cardinal Gibbons HS)  Following his sophomore year, in which his Westminster Academy team won the Florida Class 2A State Championship, Green was named MVP of the State Playoff Tournament and Broward County 3A-2A-1A Player of the Year.  His signature game came at home during the regular season against Dillard High School, the three-time defending Class 6A State Champions, where he scored 38 points and made nine 3-point shots in leading his team to a blow-out victory.  Green completed his senior season and high school career at Cardinal Gibbons High School in Fort Lauderdale, Florida.

College career
Green accepted an athletic scholarship to attend the University of Florida, where he played for coach Billy Donovan's Florida Gators men's basketball team from 2004 to 2007.  He was a starting member of the Gators teams that won the 2006 NCAA Men's Division I Basketball Tournament on April 3, 2006, and the 2007 NCAA Men's Division I Basketball Tournament on April 2, 2007, as well as the 2006 and 2007 SEC Tournaments.  Green also passed the 1,000-point benchmark in his career at Florida, racking up over 1,170 points in just three seasons, the first of which he did not play much.  Four of his former teammates have also passed the 1,000 point mark: Joakim Noah, Corey Brewer, Lee Humphrey and Al Horford.

Professional career

NBA
On June 28, 2007, he was drafted in the second round, 52nd overall, by the Portland Trail Blazers in the 2007 NBA draft.

In his first year with the Blazers, Green was sent to the Blazers' development league affiliate Idaho Stampede on December 9, 2007, and was recalled on the 22nd. A need to get more playing time and practice time were noted by coach Nate McMillan as the reason behind the move. On February 21, 2008, he was traded to the Denver Nuggets for Von Wafer.

On July 28, 2008, he was traded to the New York Knicks along with Bobby Jones and a 2010 second-round pick in exchange for Renaldo Balkman. However, one day later he was released by the Knicks.

Europe

In 2008, Green signed with Basket Zaragoza 2002 of the Spanish ACB league. He debuted in the 2008 Supercopa and scored 18 points in his first game, against Joventut Badalona. On August 25, 2009, he signed with AEK Athens of the Greek Basket League. In July 2010 he returned to Spain and signed a two-year contract with CB Gran Canaria. In February 2012 he left CB Gran Canaria and signed a contract in Turkey with Tofas Bursa. In July 2013, Green signed with Limoges CSP. and won the French League title on his first season with them.

On June 20, 2014, he signed a two-year deal with ASVEL Basket. After one season, he parted ways with ASVEL. On August 16, 2015, he signed with Sidigas Avellino of Italy. On February 13, 2016, he left Avelino and returned to his former club AEK Athens for the rest of the season.

On August 15, 2016, Green signed with Israeli team Bnei Herzliya for the 2016–17 season. On June 6, 2017, Green signed a two-year contract extension with Herzliya. On January 8, 2018, Green recorded a career-high 28 points, shooting 8-for-13 from the field, along with 5 assists in an 86–82 win over Ironi Nes Ziona. Three days later, he was named Israeli League Round 12 MVP.

On November 8, 2018, Green returned to France for a second stint, signing a one-year deal with the Antibes Sharks.

On September 23, 2019, he has signed a try-out contract with Le Mans Sarthe of the LNB Pro A. He will replace injured Brandon Taylor for 8–10 weeks. On November 13, 2019, Le Mans announced the signing of Taurean Green till the end of the season.

On July 7, 2020, he has signed with Stal Ostrów Wielkopolski of the Polish Basketball League (PLK).

The Basketball Tournament (TBT)
In the summer of 2017, Green played in The Basketball Tournament on ESPN for Pedro's Posse.  He competed for the $2 million prize, and for Pedro's Posse, he scored 15 points in their loss to Team 23 in the first round, by a score of 107–92.

Georgian national team
Green has citizenship with Georgia, and he played with the senior men's Georgian national basketball team at the qualification tournament for EuroBasket 2011, where he averaged 11.0 points, 2.5 assists, 2.4 rebounds, and 0.4 steals per game.

Career statistics

NBA

Regular season

|-
| align="left" | 
| align="left" | Portland
| 8 || 0 || 5.5 || .250 || .125 || 1.000 || 0.5 || 1.0 || 0.1 || 0.0 || 2.1
|-
| align="left" | 
| align="left" | Denver
| 9 || 0 || 3.3 || .333 || .333 || .750 || 0.7 || 0.3 || 0.1 || 0.0 || 1.1
|- class="sortbottom"
| style="text-align:center;" colspan="2"| Career
| 17 || 0 || 4.4 || .280 || .182 || .917 || 0.6 || 0.6 || 0.1 || 0.0 || 1.6

Europe

|-
| align="left" | 2008–2009
| align="left" | CAI Zaragoza
| 25 || 25 || 25.0 || .432 || .418 || .770 || 2.3 || 2.0 || 1.1 || 0.5 || 10.7
|-
| align="left" | 2009–2010
| align="left" | AEK Athens
| 24 || 24 || 33.5 || .391 || .373 || .836 || 2.8 || 3.5 || 1.5 || 0.0 || 15.2
|-
| align="left" | 2010–2011
| align="left" | Gran Canaria
| 29 || 29 || 24.6 || .339 || .296 || .797 || 2.3 || 4.0 || 1.0 || 0.0 || 8.8
|-
| align="left" | 2011–2012
| align="left" | Gran Canaria
| 14 || 14 || 15.2 || .237 || .154 || .750 || 0.8 || 2.2 || 0.4 || 0.0 || 3.5
|-
| align="left" | 2012
| align="left" | Tofaş Bursa
| 6 || 6 || 29.5 || .261 || .225 || .773 || 2.0 || 4.3 || 0.5 || 0.0 || 10.4
|-
| align="left" | 2012–2013
| align="left" | Basket Barcellona
| 56 || 56 || 31.2 || .433 || .368 || .907 || 3.4 || 4.8 || 1.7 || 0.0 || 12.6

See also

 List of Florida Gators in the NBA

References

External links
FIBA Archive Profile
FIBA Europe Profile
Euroleague.net Profile
Draftexpress.com Profile
RealGM.com Profile
Eurobasket.com Profile
infopage @ AEK.com
Spanish League Profile 
Italian League Profile 
Greek Basket League Profile 

1986 births
Living people
AEK B.C. players
African-American basketball players
American expatriate basketball people in France
American expatriate basketball people in Greece
American expatriate basketball people in Israel
American expatriate basketball people in Italy
American expatriate basketball people in Poland
American expatriate basketball people in Spain
American expatriate basketball people in Turkey
American men's basketball players
ASVEL Basket players
Basketball players from Florida
Basket Zaragoza players
Bnei Hertzeliya basketball players
CB Gran Canaria players
Colorado 14ers players
Denver Nuggets players
Florida Gators men's basketball players
Greek Basket League players
Idaho Stampede players
Le Mans Sarthe Basket players
Liga ACB players
Limoges CSP players
Men's basketball players from Georgia (country)
Olympique Antibes basketball players
Point guards
Portland Trail Blazers draft picks
Portland Trail Blazers players
S.S. Felice Scandone players
Sportspeople from Boca Raton, Florida
Stal Ostrów Wielkopolski players
Tofaş S.K. players
21st-century African-American sportspeople
20th-century African-American people